Dominik Reinhardt (born 19 December 1984) is a German football manager and former player.

Career 
At Bayer Leverkusen, where his father played at that time, he started playing football. In his youth career he also played for FC Bayern Munich, TSV Hoechstadt and 1. FC Nürnberg. In Nuremberg he signed his first senior contract in 2002.

Since season 2005–06 he has been a starting line-up player. He scored one goal for 1. FC Nürnberg on 22 October 2005 in the match against Arminia Bielefeld.

In 2007, he won the German DFB-Pokal. In the following season he played his first UEFA-Cup match on 20 September 2007 against FC Rapid București (0–0). On 21 July 2009, Reinhardt was loaned out from 1. FC Nürnberg to the second division club FC Augsburg for one year. After that season he transferred to FC Augsburg.

Personal life
Reinhardt is the son of the former player in the Germany national football team, Alois Reinhardt.

Honours
1. FC Nürnberg
DFB-Pokal: 2006–07

References

External links
 Dominik Reinhardt Interview

1984 births
Living people
Sportspeople from Leverkusen
German footballers
Association football fullbacks
Germany under-21 international footballers
Germany youth international footballers
1. FC Nürnberg players
1. FC Nürnberg II players
FC Augsburg players
FC Augsburg II players
Bundesliga players
2. Bundesliga players
Regionalliga players
Oberliga (football) players
Footballers from North Rhine-Westphalia